Supanova Comic Con & Gaming (also known simply as Supanova) is a fan convention focusing on science fiction and fantasy film and TV, comic books, anime, gaming and collectables. It is held annually in the Australian cities of Sydney, Brisbane, Melbourne, Perth, Adelaide and the Gold Coast.

The first Supanova was held at the Sydney Showground on the weekend of 20–21 April 2002. It was the successor to comicfest!, four similar conventions under the same management held between March 2000 and November 2002 in Sydney. On the weekend of 13–14 September 2003, Supanova held its first convention in the city of Brisbane at the RNA Showgrounds. In 2008, Supanova expanded to include Melbourne (back-to-back with Brisbane) and Perth (back-to-back with Sydney). In 2012, the convention expanded again, arriving on the Gold Coast and Adelaide for the first time. As of 2013, the combined annual attendance across Supanova's six events was estimated at 160,000 (From 11,600 to 39,400 in 2013 across all cities) with the largest attendance of 50,800 fans participating at the Sydney expo, June 2014.

Convention 
Supanova is an Australian-made, independent event not affiliated with foreign exposition producers. It is managed by a team of permanent staff, and was founded by Daniel Zachariou, who also served as Event Director until 2021. There are also a large number of volunteers, generally appointed on an event-by-event basis, who assist with the on-site running of the convention.

One of the major attractions at Supanova is the special guests - often well-known personalities of interest to convention attendees who participate in signing sessions and panel discussions with their fans. Other notable attractions at Supanova include the cosplay competition, the "Artist's Alley" where aspiring artists can display and sell their work, and the anime theatre. On many occasions Supanova has also hosted, as satellite events, artwork masterclasses, film screenings or similar activities. There is a large exhibitors area at Supanova where attendees can purchase merchandise from one of the many traders present.

As of 2014, Supanova is held at the Melbourne Showgrounds and Gold Coast Convention & Exhibition Centre in April, followed by Sydney Olympic Park and Perth Convention & Exhibition Centre events in June, and finally at the Brisbane Convention & Exhibition Centre and Adelaide Showground in November. Supanova's Sydney event was formerly held at the Wharf 8 Function Centre in King Street Wharf, from 2003 to 2005, before returning to Olympic Park in 2006. 2013 was the last time the event was held in Brisbane at the RNA Showgrounds (2003–2013) and Perth's Claremont Showground (2008–2013) having outgrown both venues.

In 2017, Supanova announced that they had rebranded from Supanova Pop Culture Expo to Supanova Comic Con & Gaming, citing that the video games industry had made significant strides within the industry, and the ambiguity of the "pop culture expo" branding.

Events

Past

Controversy
In June 2016, founder Daniel Zachariou shared on his Facebook page a petition calling for all transgender education to be stopped in schools, and claimed that the Safe Schools program forces children to "learn about sex, gender fluidity and transgenderism at ages as young as 5 without the supervision of parents". This led to outrage and criticism from many convention goers and personalities, and they called for a boycott of the convention. Zachariou later apologized in a post for sharing the petition, by saying "I want to express my sincere apologies to all staff, volunteers, guests and attendees of the Expo, and especially those who identify as LBGTQIA+". He further stated "in no way did I intend to express transphobic or homophobic views, which would not align with the values of acceptance and camaraderie that I hold and aim to demonstrate through Supanova".

At Supanova Sydney in June 2021, a stall in the artist hall was found to be selling items including rising sun flags, merchandise with swastikas, fascist and homophobic statements, and shirts proclaiming pride in a "Christian, heterosexual, pro-gun, conservative identity". Upon alerting staff Friday evening all products featuring Nazi and Rising Sun symbols were removed by Supanova staff prior to the convention opening to the public Saturday morning. The stallholders had been removed previously a number of years ago but had continued to exhibit annually as they had been given a 'second chance' by Supanova under threat of permanent removal. Despite this the stall continued to operate throughout Saturday however the stallholders were eventually evicted Sunday morning when fresh concerns surrounding their behavior on Saturday were raised. Supanova issued a statement stating that they "thoroughly investigated the matter with the assistance of the information provided by attendees overnight, and the exhibitor was subsequently removed from the event". However the slow response and lack of oversight by the organisers resulted in criticism from convention goers and the media, and led to renewed calls to boycott the convention. 

In response to the poor handling of the Sydney 2021 stall incident, Zachariou stepped down as Event Director in July 2021, though he still remains with the company.

See also
 Fandom
 List of multigenre conventions
 Oz Comic Con

References

External links

 

Multigenre conventions
Exhibitions in Australia
Science fiction conventions in Australia
Comics conventions
Gaming conventions
Horror conventions
Anime conventions in Australia
Recurring events established in 2002